The first postal service took place using mail sent with captains of packet ships, using agents in the England and in the islands for the end delivery. The cost was normally 3d. The first pillar boxes in Britain were introduced in the Channel Islands as an experiment in 1852, to collect mail  for the Royal Mail packet boats. The oldest pillar box in use in the British Isles is in Guernsey.

The first postage stamps printed for use in Guernsey were issued during the occupation of the island during World War II. 

In the 1950s Guernsey used British regional stamps marked specifically for use in Guernsey but valid for postage throughout the United Kingdom.

Guernsey has issued its own stamps since the creation of Guernsey Post, 1 October 1969.

The Bailiwick of Guernsey incorporates Alderney, Herm and Sark which all used the Guernsey issues from 1969.  From 1983 Guernsey began issuing specific stamps designated Alderney for use in that island which are also valid throughout the Bailiwick of Guernsey..

In 1998 postage stamps were issued without a price stated on the stamp, the terms "Local" and "UK" being used to distinguish the values. In 2010 "EUR" (Europe) and "ROW" (Rest of World) were issued. In 2012 this was expanded further with "UK Letter", "GY letter" (Guernsey) "INT letter" (International) "UK large" and "GY large" designating envelope size and destination.

Starting in 2015, Guernsey also issues Post & Go stamps.

See also

 List of postage stamps of Guernsey
 List of postage stamps of Alderney
 Revenue stamps of Guernsey

References

Further reading

Channel Islands & Guernsey
 Danan, Yves Maxime. Histoire Postale des îles de la Manche. Paris: "Le Monde des philatélistes", 1976/78. Comprising: Vol. 1: Les Affranchissements de guerre de 1870 à 1944; Vol. 2: La Libération, compléments depuis 1945, les conséquences de l'indépendance postale.
 Gurney, David. Postal History of the Guernsey Sub-Post Offices. Ilford: CISS Publishing, 1996 , 265p.
 Martin, F. Story of Guernsey Postage Stamps 1940-1941, during the occupation by the German military authorities. Guernsey: The Guernsey Press Co., n.d. 15p.
 Mohle, Heinz. Die Briefmarken von den Kanal-Inseln: Guernsey & Jersey, Deutsche Besetzung 1940-1945. Frankfurt am Main: Arbeitsgemeinschaft Neues Handbuch der Briefmarkenkunde e.V. im Bund Deutscher Philatelisten e.V., 1970, 43p.
 Newport, William. The Airmails of the Channel Islands. Sidcup: Channel Islands Specialists' Society, 1957, 12p. 
 Newport, William. The Channel Islands: France mail services, 1683-1939. Sidcup: Channel Islands Specialists' Society, 1956, 20p. 
 Newport, William. Early Channel Islands postal history and notes on other material. Sidcup: Channel Islands Specialists' Society, 1958, 39p. 
 Newport, William. Stamps and Postal History of the Channel Islands. London: Heinemann, 1972 , 214p.
 Newport, William and John O. Simpson. Numeral obliterations and instructional marks of the Channel Islands. Sidcup: Channel Islands Specialists' Society, 1957, 12p. 
 Newport, William and John O. Simpson. Postal affairs during the German occupation of the Channel Islands 1940-1945. Sidcup: Channel Islands Specialists' Society, 1957, 32p.   
 Stanley Gibbons Channel Islands Specialised Catalogue of Stamps and Postal History. London: Stanley Gibbons, 1983 , 451p.
 Summers, Howard. Bibliography of the Philately and Postal History of the British Isles. Borehamwood: Howcom Services, 2020  210p.
 Wieneke, Michael. The German Field Post Office in the Channel Islands: communications of the military and of the civilian inhabitants through the German Field Post Service 1940-1945. Grouville, Jersey: The Channel Islands Occupation Society (Jersey Branch), 1981, 16p.

Alderney, Herm, Jethou & Sark
 Backman, Anders and Bob Forrester. The Channel Island of Jethou: its stamps and postal history. Stockholm: A. Backman, 1978
 Backman, Anders and Robert Forrester. The Smaller Channel Islands Catalogue. Stockholm: A. Backman, 1989
 Newell, Peter E. Stamps of Alderney: An Illustrated Priced Guide and Handbook. Brighton: Channel Islands & Lundy Auctions, 1988 
 Newport, William. The Island of Herm and its Posts. Sidcup: Channel Islands Specialists' Society, 1970
 Newport, William and Stanley Newman. Postal History & Stamps of Sark: An Illustrated Priced Guide and Handbook. Brighton: Channel Islands & Lundy Auctions, 1990

External links
Guernsey Post
 Lions, Leopards, Unicorns & Dragons: The first "Regional" stamps The British Postal Museum & Archive

Guernsey
Communications in Guernsey
Guernsey